The 36th Moscow International Film Festival took place from 19 to 28 June 2014. Russian film director Gleb Panfilov was the head of the main jury. Gabe Polsky's Red Army was selected to open the festival with Matt Reeves' Dawn of the Planet of the Apes closing it. The Japanese film My Man won the Golden George.

Films in competition
The following films were selected for the main competition:

Jury
Main Competition
 Gleb Panfilov (Head of the Jury) (Russian film director)
 Abderrahmane Sissako (Mauritanian film director)
 Franziska Petri (German actress)
 Levan Koguashvili (Georgian film director)
 Laurent Danielou (French film producer)

Documentary Competition
 Sean McAllister (Jury Chairman) (British filmmaker)
 Amir Labaki (Brazilian film festival director)
 Alina Rudnitskaya (Russian film director)

FIPRESCI Jury
 Gideon Kouts (President) (France)
 Andres Nazarala (Chile)
 Rita di Santo (United Kingdom)
 Caroline Weidner (Germany)
 Olga Surkova (Russia)

References

2014
2014 film festivals
2014 festivals in Asia
2014 festivals in Europe
2014 in Russian cinema
2014 in Moscow
June 2014 events in Russia